Alexander Soros (born 1985) is an American philanthropist. A son of billionaire George Soros, he is Deputy Chair of the Open Society Foundations and one of the World Economic Forum's Young Global Leaders of 2018.

Early life and education
Alexander Soros is the son of billionaire George Soros and Susan Weber Soros. He was raised in Katonah, New York and has a younger brother, Gregory. Alex attended King Low Heywood Thomas in Stamford, Connecticut. He graduated from New York University in 2009, and in 2018 graduated with a PhD in history from the University of California, Berkeley.

Philanthropy
Soros established himself as a philanthropist with his first major contribution to the Jewish Funds for Justice.

According to a 2011 profile in The Wall Street Journal, Soros' focus is on "progressive causes that might not have widespread support." Since then, he has joined the board of directors of organizations including Global Witness (as an advisory board member), which campaigns against environmental and human rights abuses associated with the exploitation of natural resources; the Open Society Foundations, which works to establish government accountability and democratic processes internationally; and Bend the Arc (which was formed by the merger of the Progressive Jewish Alliance and Jewish Funds for Justice in 2012).

Soros continues to donate to political causes as well. In March 2012 he donated $200,000 to the Jewish Council for Education and Research, the organization behind 2008's "Great Schlep" in support of then-candidate Barack Obama. Alex is a recipient of the 2017 Gordon Parks Foundation Award for his philanthropic support of the Arts & Humanities.

Alexander Soros Foundation
In 2012 Soros established the Alexander Soros Foundation, which is dedicated to promoting social justice and human rights. Among the foundation's initial grantees are Bend the Arc, the National Domestic Workers Alliance, which represents the rights of 2.5 million domestic workers in the U.S., and Make the Road New York, which builds the power of Latino and working class communities to achieve dignity and justice.

Alongside the Ford Foundation and the Open Society Foundations, the Alexander Soros Foundation funded the first-ever national statistical study of domestic workers ("Home Economics: The Invisible and Unregulated World of Domestic Work," released November 26, 2012).

Foundation awards 
 In July 2012, the Alexander Soros Foundation presented its inaugural ASF Award for Environmental and Human Rights Activism to Liberian activist Silas Siakor.
 In 2013, the prize went to Chut Wutty, the Cambodian activist who died defending the Prey Lang forest.
 In 2014, the prize was awarded posthumously to Edwin Chota, Jorge Ríos Pérez, Leoncio Quincima Meléndez and Francisco Pinedo—a group of indigenous leaders from Peru who were murdered because of their work trying to end illegal logging in their community in Peru's rain forest.
 In 2015, the prize went to Alphonse Muhindo Valivambene and Bantu Lukambo for their dedication to defending Virunga National Park against corrupt interests attempting to open the park to illegal oil drilling and poaching.
 In 2016, the prize went to Paul Pavol, a villager from Papua New Guinea who is speaking out against the appropriation of rainforest in his home district of Pomio by Malaysian logging conglomerate Rimbunan Hijau.
 In 2017, Antônia Melo da Silva, a longtime Brazilian environmental activist, received the Alexander Soros Foundation Award for Environmental and Human Rights Activism for her inspiring role leading campaigns to stop the construction of the Belo Monte Dam and other harmful infrastructure projects in the Amazon rainforest.

Other activities
Alex Soros is credited as a producer of several movies, including Trial by Fire and The Kleptocrats.

Publications

In 2014, Soros contributed an essay to the book God, Faith and Identity from the Ashes: Reflections of Children and Grandchildren of Holocaust Survivors.

Soros' writing has appeared in, among others, The Guardian, Politico, The Miami Herald, The Sun-Sentinel, and The Forward.

Personal life
Soros has homes in North Berkeley, Lower Manhattan and South Kensington, London.

See also
 George Soros
 Open Society Foundations
 Tides Foundation

References

External links
 Alexander Soros Foundation
 Open Society Foundation: Alexander Soros

1985 births
Living people
American nonprofit chief executives
American people of Hungarian-Jewish descent
American people of Russian-Jewish descent
Businesspeople from New York City
Jewish American philanthropists
New York University alumni
People from Katonah, New York
Alexander
University of California, Berkeley alumni
Philanthropists from New York (state)